Bixadoides allardi is a species of beetle in the family Cerambycidae, and the only species in the genus Bixadoides. It was described by Breuning in 1966.

References

Lamiini
Beetles described in 1966